The Orplid Mystery or Epilogue is a 1950 West German thriller film directed by Helmut Käutner and starring Horst Caspar, Bettina Moissi, and O.E. Hasse. The film did not perform well at the box office on its release.

It was made at the Spandau Studios of CCC Films. The film's sets were designed by the art director Emil Hasler.

Cast

References

Bibliography

External links 
 

1950 films
1950s spy thriller films
German spy thriller films
West German films
1950s German-language films
Films directed by Helmut Käutner
Seafaring films
German black-and-white films
Films shot at Spandau Studios
1950s German films